The Operations in the Tochi (28 November 1914–27 March 1915) were carried out by Indian Army during World War I  on the North West Frontier. The Tochi river flows East from the tribal territories, through North Waziristan, to join the Kurram and the Indus rivers. On the 28 and 29  November a raid by 2,000 tribesmen from Khost was defeated by the North Waziristan Militia near Miranshah, on the Tochi. The next January the militia again defeated a raid by tribesmen which had attacked Spina Khaisora. On 25–26 March a force of over 7,000 tribesmen, threatened Miranshah, but was defeated by the Bannu Brigade together with the local militia.

Captain Eustace Jotham
It was during these operations when Captain Eustace Jotham was awarded the Victoria Cross.

Citation

He was buried in the Miranshah Cemetery, North Waziristan, and is commemorated on the Delhi Memorial (India Gate).

See also
Mohmand blockade
Operations against the Mohmands, Bunerwals and Swatis in 1915

References

Battles of World War I involving British India